Oak Openings Preserve Metropark is a nature preserve located in Swanton Township, Ohio, owned and operated by Metroparks Toledo. Most of the park is an oak savanna ecosystem, characterized by alternating wetland and vegetated dunes.

The park hosts the Beuhner Center, an interactive nature center.  There are over fifty miles of trails in Oak Openings Preserve.

The park gets its name from the region in which it is located.  Oak Openings Preserve lies within the larger Oak Openings Region. The region hosts over 180 rare species of plants and animals. This is over one-third of all rare species found in the state of Ohio.

According to The Nature Conservancy, the Oak Openings Region is one of the 200 "Last Great Places on Earth".

Gallery

References

Protected areas of Lucas County, Ohio
Parks in Ohio
Nature reserves in Ohio
Works Progress Administration in Toledo, Ohio
Civilian Conservation Corps in Ohio
Metroparks Toledo